George James Sandford (6 July 1872 – 25 May 1940) was an Australian rules footballer who played with St Kilda in the Victorian Football League (VFL).

References

External links 

1872 births
1940 deaths
Australian rules footballers from Victoria (Australia)
St Kilda Football Club players
People educated at Geelong College